Kaw Township is a township in Jefferson County, Kansas, USA.

External links
 City-Data.com

Townships in Jefferson County, Kansas
Townships in Kansas